Goonumbla is a bounded rural locality in Parkes Shire, Central, New South Wales.   
Goonumbla is about 299km west-northwest of NSW's capital city of Sydney, and is on the Parkes–Narromine railway line. The population is about 320.

Goonumbla was first opened up during the Gold Rush, but has since become predominantly Agricultural in nature. The railway station has closed.

References